The fashion of Colombian singer Shakira, both inside and outside of music, has impacted trends, especially in Latin America, and she is currently considered a style icon. Her unique style in the 90s and early 2000s led to her being considered a "teen idol" throughout Latin America, parts of Europe, and North America.

Fashion and style

Latin Fashion 
At the beginning of her career, Shakira, like many Latin singers at that time, did not have much interest in fashion. According to Vogue España, Shakira's style during the 90's was described as "rocker with hints of metal." Vogue Mexico, described Shakira's early styl as "unique", fashion that mixed the "urban" and "bucolic", highlighting both the ripped pants she used, as well as her cropped garments, which were often in her favorite shade, black.

Her looks often consisted of jackets and jeans, shirts, bare feet and long black hair that years later according to Vogue magazine would become a global trend. Shakira dominated and imposed a trend with her used clothes for her look in youth, later the style used in her lead song from her album "Dónde Están Los Ladrones?" which is considered "traced the aesthetic coordinates of the future". Later years Shakira would show a great change of image, the hair was the most criticized and notorious of her stylistic change, various people and some journalists criticized Shakira for wanting to "Americanize" and "fit in" with the other pop divas. Her wardrobe also gave a lot to talk about in the Latino youth mostly, she was shown for a more punk-inclined wardrobe with clothes made of leather and lace, this style would also be widely replicated in some young Latinas and United States during the early 2000s. According to journalist Andrea Arzola, Shakira is considered one of the forerunners of the "Peep Toe" shoe trend, being one of the first to use them.

Indian Fashion 
Shakira was credited with bringing the fashions of Middle Eastern culture to the mainstream, it is believed that her "fusion of styles" helped make people more accepting of dances and sounds from countries like India during the late 1990s. thousand girls in Latin countries were enrolled in Belly dance classes suggesting that it was due to Shakira's total influence, after the year 2000 countries like the United States would be affected by Shakira's influence, belly dance belts would be widely used by young women and men as well as children from all over the world. Such was the impact of all this that the Arabian coin belts usually worn as part of belly dance attire are commonly known as "Shakira belts". In the year 2004 thanks to Shakira The use of different belts often inspired by different cultures revived the production and trend of belts in the fashion industry.

Fusion Fashion 
The name Fusion Fashion is a name given to a new trend in fashion in the 2000s that Shakira is credited with introducing due to her distinctive Latin and Middle Eastern aesthetic. Also, thanks to the fusion of aesthetics, it generated a great impact in Middle Eastern countries where Shakira "opened the doors" for record labels like EMI to give several artists from countries like India the opportunity to work with them.

Hair Fashion 

The look that Shakira captured with her first two international albums was widely emulated by the girls especially for her fans, one of the most imitated things was the hair with colored braids that she was seen wearing in the video "Ciega, Sordomuda", in various Shakira interviews in countries like Peru or Mexico, girls and young people of the time were presented with braided hair and decorated with colored ribbons. After this style, she wore red hair for a very short time, current artists such as Karol G and Rosalía who also used hair of this color were quickly compared to Shakira, in the 2000s Shakira used a very characteristic hair style consisting of blonde hair that contrasted strongly with black strands, according to Vogue magazine this hair style was the inspiration for artists like Miley Cyrus who during the year 2021 used a very similar style.

Legacy 

During the mid-90s, Shakira was already making herself known in the world of Latin music and some parts of Europe thanks to her successful international debut album. according to Edgar Garcia in the book "Shakira ¡Que viva Colombia!" Shakira had reached a status of importance in Latin adolescents, this led to the appearance of various "impersonators" who emulated her look, voice, movements and characteristics of her. She used a look described by various media as "Rocker", leather pants, bracelets and quite prominent hair, it was a sensation in America in countries like Spain, Turkey and Latin countries like Mexico and Argentina, Shakira's style had become a daily fashion for girls and adolescents emulating the singer during her look used in her "¿Dónde Están los ladrones?" era, they wore the thread bracelets and the braids of Colors, they loved that hippie look of the new century and they identified with the sounds that Shakira embodied in her albums. Shakira came to have different imitators around the end of the 90's and the beginning of the decade 2000. During the presentation of Shakira's crossover album in the United States, many girls were seen arriving with blonde hair in the "Shakira Style" and with their Arab dance accessories trying to imitate her dance steps. According to the media in 2002, "Not only has her music been a huge sensation in the United States, but her looks of skintight second-hand skinny jeans, old shirts, and funky hats have sparked a style revolution. That has been extended to girls all over the world.

On Public 
According to Vogue editor Cecilia Suarez Olvera, the youth generation of the 90s "embraced" the image that Shakira used, feeling it "close and identifiable." The style that Shakira presented when it came to dressing and behaving was a posture of irreverence before the established norms of what a famous singer should be and the way she had to look. According to Shakira: Woman Full of Grace, Shakira's image was daily fashion for various adolescents who identified with her and her way of expressing themselves.

Shakira reaction 
During an interview conducted in 2002, Shakira was made aware of the impact she had on the world of fashion due to the impact of her image on adolescent girls around the world, to which she said «Really? I didn't know that," she laughs. “I'm not the type of girl who loves shopping. I actually hate it. I have no patience for shopping. I don't think in terms of fashion, really. In fact, it's the last thing I think about when it comes to doing a video or a photo shoot or that kind of thing».

Selected wardrobe

At auctions 
Various garments that Shakira has used in concerts and sporting events in which she has participated have been auctioned at charity events and pages such as ebay. In 2008 Shakira offered a large part of the accessories from her tour "Oral Fixation Tour" for an auction that benefits her foundation.

Museum exhibitions

Hard Rock Cafe 
Various Shakira garments used in her videos, her presentations and more are exhibited in various museums and exhibitions in countries around the world, at the Hard Rock Cafe various garments worn by Shakira are exhibited, one of the best known is the wardrobe used in her concert "Tour of the Mongoose" that is presented at the hard rock café in London, more garments that are exposed are the suit used in the official video of her song "Waka Waka", in countries like Malaysia the pants used by Shakira when she performed the cover of "Back in Black" by the band AC/DC at the concert in 2003, In Malaga, the blue dress that Shakira used during her presentation of the song "Antes de las Seis" is exposed.

National Museum of Women in the Arts 
Shakira's wardrobe from her 2001 video "Whenever Wherever" was featured at the National Museum of Women in the Arts in an exhibition called Women Who Rock

Madame Tusan 
In the Madame Tussauds museums in many countries statues of Shakira are exhibited wearing replicas of various costumes worn by Shakira years ago, from suits and dresses from previous years to the present.

Fashion Dolls 
Since the appearance of Shakira in the world market, her presented look caused a sensation, the Mattel brand in 2001 launched doll designs with the appearances of Shakira in the videos "Whenever Wherever", "Objection (Tango)" and the look of the red carpet at the VH1 Divas event, after the Halftime show in 2020 the barbie brand launched its doll with Shakira-inspired hair, face and clothing.

Magazine covers 

Shakira from her beginning in the music industry was taken to be the face of national and international magazines, highlighting her musical style, influence and appearance, in the 2000s Shakira appeared in the prestigious music magazine "Rolling Stone" being the first female latin artist to appear, for months after appearing Along with Britney Spears and Mary J Blige, despite not being a "lover" of fashion, she has appeared as the protagonist of covers in various magazines of all kinds including fashion and style magazines, in 2003 she appeared as the protagonist of Elle magazine in its version for the United States and Korea, in later years Shakira continued to appear on the covers of magazines such as i-D in 2009, Harper's Bazaar (Spanish edition) in 2017, Glamour in 2021 and more recently Vogue in its Latin edition.

Gallery

See also 

 Shakira impersonator
 Cultural impact of Shakira
 Shakira Fandom

References 

Shakira
Fashion by people